Sala (also transliterated Srala) is a village in Kak Commune in northeast Cambodia.  As of 1998, it had a population of 245 in 37 households and a sex ratio of 1.15 men to 1 woman. Its chief was Sev Yun as of 2006. Village chiefs are selected by consensus by elders and other villagers in a discussion that can take two to three days. Some leaders are selected based on visions in dreams.  After a chief is appointed, a ceremony is held so that the new chief can gain recognition and trust from the villagers.

References

Populated places in Ratanakiri province
Villages in Cambodia